The FN Model 24 series is a line of Mauser Gewehr 98 pattern bolt-action battle rifles produced by the Belgian Fabrique Nationale. They are similar to the Czech vz. 24 rifle, featuring open sights, 8×57mm IS chambering, carbine-length barrels, hardwood stocks, and straight bolt handles.

History
After World War I and the German defeat, Belgium manufactured derivative of the Mauser 98, slightly modified. The rifle series was modified depending on each customer's needs. The designation Mle 24/30 is incorrect strictly speaking, since the Model 24 rifle is different from the Model 30. The confusion comes from the fact both versions were marketed at the same time in the 1930s. The last rifles were produced in 1964.

Belgium 
The Belgian Armed Forces did not order the FN Mle 24/30 before the war. After the war, some training carbines Mle 24 in .22 Long Rifle were produced for the Belgian Army, the Belgian Navy and the colonial Force Publique. The Belgian and Congolese forces also received some .30-06 new-production Mle 24/30 (aka Mle 50) carbines. These carbines could be still found in the hand of Belgian reservists until 1986.

Bolivia 
Bolivia received some quantities of FN Model 24/30 rifles. They were used during the Chaco War and were still in service after the 1952 Revolution.

China 
The Republic of China received 24,000 FN Model 24 and 30 from 1930 to 1934 and more than 165,000 Model 30 between 1937 and 1939. The Model 30 was copied as the Type 21 rifle at the Kwantung Arsenal and Type 77 rifle (from 1937, year of the Marco Polo Bridge Incident) at the Zhejiang Iron Works. All these models were used during the Chinese Civil War and Second Sino-Japanese War, being still in service at the end of World War II and during the Korean War. Ex-Lithuanian FN 1930 rifles captured by the Soviets were even supplied post-war to the People's Liberation Army.

Colombia 
In the early 1930s, Colombia bought FN Model 24 and 30 rifles in 7×57mm Mauser. Many were later converted to .30-06 Springfield after 1950, serving alongside newly produced FN Model 50 short rifles.

Congo 

After the war, the Force Publique of the Belgian Congo received some thousands of newly manufactured Mle 24/30 carbines. Around 300 training rifles were also delivered. After the independence as Republic of the Congo, the Congo Crisis broke. The FN Mle 24/30 were used during these conflicts, being seen in the hands of South Kasai secessionist gendarmes or of Simba rebels.

Ethiopia 
The Ethiopian Empire bought 25,000 7.92×57mm Model 24/30 short rifles and carbines in 1933–1935. They were fielded during the Italian invasion.

France 
Between July and December 1939, FN produced 6,500 Model 24/30 short rifles in 7.92×57mm Mauser. They were probably used in the French colonies.

Germany 
After the German invasion of Belgium, FN-made rifles were used by second-line German units. The Belgian Mle 24 rifles were designated Gewehr 220 (b) and the Mle 24 carbines Karabiner 420 (b). The Greek Model 30 was designated Gewehr 285 (b). The Yugoslav M24A was referred to as Gewehr 291/1 (j) and the M24B as Gewehr 291/2 (j).

Greece 
Needing more rifles during the interwar period, Greece bought more than 75,000 FN Model 24/30 short rifles between 1930 and 1939. They were known as Model 1930. These rifles were used during the Greco-Italian War, the German invasion, the Greek Resistance.

Haiti 
During the 1930s or after the war, Haiti ordered Model 24/30 short rifles in .30-06 Springfield. They were used by the Volontaires de la Sécurité Nationale militia. They were kept in reserve storage in the 1990s.

Indonesia 
Between 1946 and 1950, the Dutch company Indische Ondernemers Bond (Indies Business Union), bought 2,700 Mle 24 carbines for private security tasks, modified in the Netherlands to fire .308 Winchester/7.62 NATO. The Royal Netherlands Indies Police reportedly also used some. Some were also kept in 7.92 Mauser. They have been later used by the independentist Free Papua Movement.

Israel 
Israel bought in the early 1950s some FN Model 30 short rifles originally in 7.92 Mauser. They were clones of the Kar 98k and were later modified to fire 7.62 NATO. This state also received some Mle 24 training rifles. A few German captured Greek Mauser were also supplied via Czechoslovakia.

Liberia 
From the early 1930s to the end of World War II, the Belgian-made Model 24 short rifle was the standard rifle of Liberian Frontier Force.

Lithuania 
During the late-1930s, Lithuania bought more than 75,000 Fusil Mle 30, exactly similar to the Brno-made vz. 24 used by the Lithuanian Army. Both were designated Model 24 L.

Luxembourg 
Luxembourg ordered some Model 24/30 short rifles around 1930. They were later captured and used by the German Army after the invasion of Luxembourg.

Mexico 
In 1926 and 1927, Mexico ordered some 35,000 FN Mle 24 short rifles and carbines, chambered in 7mm Mauser.

Morocco 
In the 1950s, Morocco bought Model 1950 carbines in .308 Winchester and .30-06.

Paraguay 
Paraguay ordered FN Mle 24/30 short rifles during the late-1930s, designated them Model 1935. Others sources state 7,000 were bought before 1932 and were used during the Chaco War. In the 1960s, many of these 7.65 Mauser guns were modified to 7.62×51mm NATO in Brazil.

Persia 
The Imperial Persian Army bought some FN Mle 24 short rifles at the end of the 1920s.

Peru 

During the late 1930s, Peru ordered FN 24/30. It had an inverted safety, which was activated by being turned to the left of the rifle. This 7.65mm Mauser version is known as Peruvian Model 1935 short rifle. They were used during the Ecuadorian–Peruvian War of 1941. From 1959 to 1960, they were reportedly modified to accept .30-06 ammunitions.

Venezuela 
Venezuela ordered 16,500 FN Mle 30 short rifles and carbines in the mid-1930s, firing the 7mm Mauser cartridge. A very small number had a  longer barrel, being designed to train the Venezuelan Olympic team. Many more standard FN Mle 30 guns were delivered after the war.

Arabian Peninsula 
In the 1930s, both the Kingdom of Saudi Arabia and the Mutawakkilite Kingdom of Yemen bought a substantial number of FN Mle 30 short rifles. Saudi Arabia bought "substantial numbers" of FN rifles in 1945–1950. Some of the Saudi rifles may have been sent to Yemen after the war.

Yugoslavia 

The first Mauser-pattern rifle produced in Yugoslavia was the M24. Its predecessor, the FN Model 1924 had been produced for the Yugoslav army by FN Herstal until the Ministry and FN signed a contract on the purchase of the licence for production of rifles  7.9 mm M 24. Nearly all M24's were produced either before or during World War II, at the Kragujevac Arsenal plant. The M24 and Model 1924 are nearly identical. All M24 series weapons are designed to accept the M-24/48 pattern bayonet.

The final additions to the M24 family were the M24/47 rifle. These were produced by reworking existing prewar Serbian Model 24 Mausers and then refurbished with new parts at the Zastava Arms (formally Kragujevac Arsenal) plant, which was at that time under the control of the postwar communist government.  The "47" of the M-24/47 indicated the beginning of the rebuild program of 1947. The rebuild program lasted into the early 1950s alongside new production of M48 rifles.  M24 series rifles were used by the Royal Yugoslav Army and by nearly all sides during World War II in Yugoslavia.

Other users 
Argentina bought many FN Model 24 rifles and Model 30 short rifles during the interwar period. The FN Model 24 in 7×57mm was also exported to Costa Rica around 1935. Ecuador received 7.65×53mm Mauser Model 30 short rifles. Romania used some FN Mle 24 short rifles. Uruguay bought approximately 5,000 Model 24 short rifles in 7mm Mauser during the 1930s. Turkey is listed as one of the users.

During the Nicaraguan Revolution, FN Mle 24 short rifles were carried by Sandinista rebels.

Variants

Belgium 
 Mod. 1922 long rifle - a full-length copy of the Gew. 98. Only sample rifles with Siamese or Ethiopian markings are known.
 Mod. 1922 carbine, an older and shorter version of the FN Model 30, chambered in 7mm and featuring a straight stock. More than 20,000 carbines were produced between 1922 and 1924 to equip Brazilian cavalry and artillery.
Fusil Mle 1924
Fusil Mle 1930
Fusil Mle 1924 d’entrainement - .22 Long Rifle training rifle, manufactured 1948–1952.
Fusil Mle 1950 - Model 1924 export rifle modified to fire .30-06 Springfield cartridges.
Peruvian Model 1935 Short Rifle - Standard export model with an inverted safety.
FN Mle 30-11 - 7.62 NATO sniper rifle based on the FN Mle 30, manufactured 1976–1986.

China 
 Type 21 rifle - copy of the FN Model 30 short rifle in 7.92×57mm Mauser produced in the Kwantung Arsenal in the early 1930s.
 Type 77 rifle - copy of the FN Model 30 produced in the Zhejiang Iron Works in the late 1930s. It was not compatible with other Mausers.

Yugoslavia
M.1924B - Designation of Gewehr 98 and M1912 Mexican Mauser rifles whose barrels were changed to M24's to meet the Army's standards as far as length and the common cartridge. The conversion was done in Užice. Original bayonets were also converted to fit the new barrels.
It was designed for youth firearms training and target practice.
Jurišna puška M.1924 (Assault rifle M.1924) -  These can be identified by МОДЕЛ 1924 ЧК (MODEL 1924 ČK) written on the chamber, a bent bolt handle and an additional set of sling swivels on left side. It was designed after the Sokol carbine, Czecho-Slovak short gendarmerie rifle and Iranian Musketon, for use with assault units. The production started in May 1940, only about 5,000-6,000 were made. They were issued with a special combat knife that could be fitted on the rifle as a bayonet.
M.24/47 Rifle - M24 Rifles and Carbines of Belgian and Yugoslavian manufacture brought up to a common standard beginning in 1947 and continuing into the early 1950s. Most received new M48 barrels with 98k type front sight hoods not found on Model 1924's. Carbine features deleted rear swivel removed and plugged with dowel front carbine sling points ground off and polished.

Users 

 
 
 
  (M1922)
 
 
 
 
 
 
 
 
 
 
 
 
 
 
 
 
 
 
 
  Nicaraguan Sandinista National Liberation Front
 
  
  
 
 
 
 
  Kingdom of Yemen

See also
vz. 24
Belgian Mauser Model 1935
Belgian Mausers
M48 Mauser

References

 
 
 

7.65×53mm Mauser rifles
7.92×57mm Mauser rifles
Rifles of Yugoslavia
Rifles of Belgium
World War II infantry weapons of China
World War II military equipment of Yugoslavia
Mauser rifles
7×57mm Mauser rifles
.30-06 Springfield rifles
7.62×51mm NATO rifles
Military equipment introduced in the 1920s